CWG may refer to:

 CWG (repurposing company), New York State-based, recycles cell phones
 CWG Markets, a British financial trading company
 Conversations with God, a series of books by Neale Donald Walsch
 Commonwealth Games, sports event involving countries that generally were in the British Empire